The Cook Islands national futsal team is the representative team for the Cook Islands in international futsal competitions. It is controlled by the Cook Islands Football Association.

Tournament records

FIFA World Cup

Oceanian Futsal Championship record

References

Oceanian national futsal teams
National sports teams of the Cook Islands